is a professional Japanese baseball player. He plays pitcher for the Fukuoka SoftBank Hawks.

External links

 NPB.com

1977 births
Fukuoka SoftBank Hawks players
Japanese baseball players
Hokkaido Nippon-Ham Fighters players
Living people
Nippon Ham Fighters players
Nippon Professional Baseball pitchers
Baseball people from Sendai
Waseda University alumni
Yokohama BayStars players
Yokohama DeNA BayStars players